This is an incomplete list of front projection CRT video projectors.

List of CRT projectors

 
 
 

 
 

 
 
 
 

 

 

 
 
 
 

 
 
 
 
 

 
 
 
 
 
 
 
 

 
 

 
 
 
 
 
 
 
 
 
 
 
 
 
 
 
 
 
 
 
 
 

 
 
 
 
 
 
 
 
 

 

 
 
 
 
 
 
 
 

 
 
 
 
 
 
 
 
 
 
 
 
 
 
 

 
 
 
 
 
 
 

 
 
 
 
 
 
 

 
 
 
 
 
 
 
 
 
 
 
 
 
|}

Re-badged projectors
A number of projector manufacturers produced projectors that were sold under the brand of different makers, sometimes with minor electrical or cosmetic modification. The following list reflects these re-badged projectors.

External links
 Curt Palme CRT Projector FAQs, Tips, Manuals

References

 https://web.archive.org/web/20061216172634/http://www.freebrd.com/69PG-Cross.html

Projectors